Menéndez or Menendez is a Spanish name. In English the name is often spelled without the diacritic. A shorter form sharing the same root is Mendez. It may refer to:

Persons
 Andrés Ignacio Menéndez (1879–1962), President of El Salvador twice, in 1934–1935 and 1944
 Emilio Menéndez (born 1945), Spanish politician and member of the European Parliament
 Francisco Menéndez (1830–1890), President of El Salvador 1885–1890
 Francisco Menendez (creole) (18th century), former slave who led a militia against the British in 1740
 Jorge Fernández Menéndez (contemporary), Mexican editor and columnist
 Katherine M. Menendez, American judge
 Luciano Benjamín Menéndez (1927–2018), Argentine general, Provisional Federal Interventor of Córdoba, Argentina 1975
 Mario Benjamín Menéndez (1930–2015), Argentine general, military Governor of the Falklands during the Falklands War
 Lyle and Erik Menendez, American brothers who were convicted of murdering their parents in 1989
 Manuel Menéndez (1793–1847), President of Peru for three brief periods 1841–1845
 Marcelino Menéndez y Pelayo (1856–1912), Spanish scholar, historian, and literary critic
 Matilde Menéndez (born 1944), Argentine psychiatrist and public official
 Osleidys Menéndez (born 1979), Cuban Olympic championship javelin thrower
 Pedro Menéndez de Avilés (1519–1574), first governor of Spanish Florida & governor of colonial Cuba
 Pidal Juan Menéndez (1861–1915), Spanish archivist, jurisconsult, historian, and poet
 Pidal Luis Menéndez (1860–1932), Spanish genre painter
 Pidal María Goyri de Menéndez (1873–1955), Spanish Hispanicist, professor, and author
 Ramón Menéndez Pidal or Pidal Ramón Menéndez (1869–1968), Spanish philologist and historian
 Robert "Bob" Menendez (born 1954), American politician, Representative and Senator from New Jersey

Fictional characters
Raul Menendez, the main antagonist of Call of Duty: Black Ops II

Places
San Francisco Menéndez, municipality in the Ahuachapán department of El Salvador

Other uses
Pedro Menendez High School, St. Johns County, Florida, United States

See also
Mendez
Mendes (name)

Spanish-language surnames
Patronymic surnames